Pia Alonzo Wurtzbach (born September 24, 1989), formerly known professionally as Pia Romero, is a Filipino  model, actress and beauty queen who is known for being crowned Miss Universe 2015.

She joined Binibining Pilipinas pageant three times, and won in 2015 in her third attempt. She then represented Philippines at the Miss Universe 2015 pageant, where she eventually won the title, becoming the first Filipina to win the pageant in four decades, and the first Filipina to win the pageant in the 21st century. She is the third Filipina to win the title of Miss Universe, following Gloria Diaz who won in 1969 and Margie Moran who won in 1973, and was succeeded by Catriona Gray three years later, with Gray winning Miss Universe 2018.

Early life and education
Pia Alonzo Wurtzbach was born in Stuttgart, Germany, to a German father and Filipino mother. She has a sister who is two years younger than she is. The family later moved to Northern Mindanao region in the Philippines, first in Iligan city, then settled at Cagayan de Oro city, where she attended kindergarten at Kong Hua School and primary school at Corpus Christi School.

Her parents separated when she was 11 years old, and she became the family's main breadwinner by modeling and acting. After being raised in the Philippines, she spent several years in England. She finished her secondary education at ABS-CBN Distance Learning Center in Quezon City, Metro Manila, and studied culinary arts at the Center for Asian Culinary Studies in San Juan, Metro Manila. Wurtzbach speaks fluent Cebuano, English, and Tagalog. She also speaks basic German, which she described as "enough to get myself a bratwurst".

Acting career
Wurtzbach is a professional model, actress, host and TV personality. She began acting at age four under the stage name Pia Romero. Managed by ABS-CBN Corporation's talent agency, Star Magic, she was included on the Star Circle Batch 11.  Among her TV credits are the teen-oriented series K2BU, the concert variety program ASAP, the romance anthology Your Song, the sitcom show Bora, and the drama series Sa Piling Mo. She appeared in films such as Kung Ako Na Lang Sana (2003), All My Life (2004), and All About Love (2006). She went on to become a stylist, makeup artist and beauty writer for Philippine Daily Inquirer's 2bU section. She then had to temporarily quit showbiz in order to focus on the Miss Universe pageant.

After becoming Miss Universe 2015, she returned to ABS-CBN after signing a two-year exclusive contract on October 9, 2017. She appeared as a guest host in ASAP and the co-host of World of Dance Philippines with Luis Manzano.

Pageantry

Binibining Pilipinas 2013

Wurtzbach joined the Binibining Pilipinas 2013 pageant where she was named as the 1st Runner-Up alongside the Miss San Miguel Zero Fit and Sexy Body award. Ariella Arida won the said pageant.

Binibining Pilipinas 2014

She joined the Binibining Pilipinas 2014, but only placed in the top 15 alongside the Miss Philippine Airlines and She's So Jag awards. A controversy erupted when she failed to win any title following her question-and-answer portion. She was asked a question in Tagalog by a Filipino judge, Senator Sonny Angara, which she answered in Tagalog. Online commentators wondered if the question and answer in Tagalog cost her points from the international judges and, therefore, any title that year. Mary Jean Lastimosa won the said pageant.

Binibining Pilipinas 2015

On her third attempt for the title in 2015, she won the highest title, Miss Universe Philippines, alongside the Miss Cream Silk awards and went on to compete in the Miss Universe 2015 Pageant. During the question and answer portion of the pageant she was asked by then-Camarines Sur Representative Leni Robredo: "Social media is now a very powerful tool on communication. Can you tell us your thoughts about internet censorship?" She answered:

On April 17, 2016, Wurtzbach crowned Maxine Medina as her successor at the Binibining Pilipinas 2016 pageant held at the Smart Araneta Coliseum in Quezon City, Philippines.

Miss Universe 2015

Wurtzbach represented the Philippines in the 64th Miss Universe pageant held on December 20, 2015 in Las Vegas, Nevada, United States.

At the national costume competition, Wurtzbach wore a white capiz terno with a matching fan and headpiece. The whole ensemble was designed by Filipino designer, Albert Andrada.

At the preliminary competition, Wurtzbach wore a black and white two-piece bikini at the preliminary swimsuit competition and a red sleeveless crepe de chine gown by Filipino designer Oliver Tolentino at the preliminary evening gown competition.

At the coronation night, Wurtzbach advanced to Top 15.

She then wore a black and white two-piece bikini at the swimsuit competition that helped her advance to Top 10. She wore Albert Andrada's figure-hugging, strapless serpentina gown. It was inspired by the Philippines, the "Pearl of the Orient". She then advanced to Top 5.

During the first question and answer round, Wurtzbach was asked by host Steve Harvey, "earlier this year, there was a controversy in the Philippines about the United States reopening a military base in your country. Do you think the United States should have a military presence in your country?" She answered:

In the final question and answer portion, the top three contestants were asked the same question by Harvey: "Why should you be the next Miss Universe?" and she replied:

 

Wurtzbach's answer references the pageant's motto "Confidently Beautiful". At the end of the show, host Steve Harvey mistakenly announced Miss Colombia Ariadna Gutiérrez as the winner. However, after Gutiérrez's crowning, Harvey returned to the stage and stated that he had misread the results and that Wurtzbach was really Miss Universe 2015. Paulina Vega (Miss Universe 2014) then removed the crown from Gutiérrez's head and placed it on Wurtzbach's head.

Wurtzbach is the third Miss Universe from the Philippines after Gloria Diaz in 1969, and Margie Moran in 1973.

On January 21, 2016, she traveled to Bali in Indonesia to shoot a commercial for C 1000, a vitamin brand available in Indonesia. Two days later, on January 23, 2016, she arrived in the Philippines for a week-long homecoming celebration with visits to the cities of Manila, Makati, Pasay and Quezon City. She also made courtesy calls to the Congress of the Philippines, Senate of the Philippines and Malacañang Palace.

On February 1, 2016, she arrived in San Francisco to fulfill her duties as Inside Editions special correspondent for Super Bowl 50. While in San Francisco, she was also reunited with Janine Tugonon, Miss Universe 2012 1st Runner-up from the Philippines.

On February 28, 2016, she travelled to Toronto, Canada to deliver a speech against bullying at the Speakers Forum for the International Students of the Language Academy of Canada wherein she shared some of her childhood experiences as a victim of bullying. During her stay in Canada, she was reunited with Miss Universe Canada 2015, Paola Nunez Valdez. She also met and gave some advice to the contestants of Miss Universe Canada 2016.

On March 25, 2016, Wurtzbach returned to the Philippines for an unannounced visit to take care of some personal things including renewing her Philippine passport, charity works and film a new commercial for Philippine Airlines. She also met and gave advice to the candidates of Binibining Pilipinas 2016 during their press presentation. On April 12, 2016 she returned to the Philippines for the Binibining Pilipinas 2016 pageant and on April 17 crowned her successor Maxine Medina as Miss Universe Philippines 2016 during the coronation night. During the pageant she was reunited with Miss Myanmar 2015, May Barani Thaw and Miss Malaysia 2015, Vanessa Tevi while Miss USA 2015, who at Miss Universe, placed 2nd runner-up, Olivia Jordan served as a judge. Wurtzbach's farewell speech and walk at Binibining Pilipinas 2016 as Miss Universe Philippines 2015, trended at social media with enormous hits.

On April 21, 2016, Wurtzbach arrived in Peru to attend Miss Peru 2016 pageant where she served as a judge. She also had a press conference a day before the pageant and was greeted by the Lima City Mayor, Luis Castaneda and received an honor of being "The Distinguished Guest of Lima". Wurtzbach along with Miss Peru 2015, Laura Spoya crowned Valeria Piazza, Miss Peru 2016.

On April 27, 2016, Wurtzbach threw out the ceremonial first pitch for the New York Mets. A month later on May 27, 2016, Wurtzbach travelled to Machala, Ecuador to help the victims of the recent earthquake that killed at least 600 people. She was welcomed by the mayor of Machala, Carlos Falquez Batallas to the city and was named as an honorary volunteer of the Guayas Red Cross wherein she was invited to participate in the global appeal of raise resources to build 6,000 homes for the earthquake victims. She was also given a chance to meet Connie Jiménez, Miss Ecuador 2016 during her visit.

In June 2016, Wurtzbach represented the Philippines and the Miss Universe Organization in a high-level meeting of the United Nations that aimed at ending AIDS.

In her capacity as Miss Universe, Wurtzbach visited Indonesia, Canada, Peru, Ecuador, Cayman Islands, Thailand, Panama, United Arab Emirates, Singapore, several cities across the United States and her native country, the Philippines.

As a parting gift on her final official photoshoot, Wurtzbach was granted access to the elusive Mikimoto Crown. Wurtzbach relinquished her Miss Universe crown and passed it on to Iris Mittenaere of France at the 65th Miss Universe pageant, held on January 30, 2017 in Mall of Asia Arena, Manila, Philippines.

Post Miss Universe
On January 30, 2017, Wurtzbach stated that she has signed a contract with WME/IMG's IMG Universe division where she will continue to work with the Miss Universe Organization as an HIV/AIDS awareness advocate after her reign.

Asia's Next Top Model cast her as a guest judge on several episodes of the fifth cycle.

She costarred with Vice Ganda and Daniel Padilla in a film under production of Star Cinema. The project served as her acting comeback after six years and her first film in more than a decade. The film entitled Gandarrapido: The Revenger Squad served as one of the eight official film entries in the 2017 Metro Manila Film Festival.

Wurtzbach served as a judge during the final coronation night of Miss Universe 2017.

She starred in another Star Cinema movie entitled My Perfect You alongside Gerald Anderson.

Wurtzbach co-hosted Binibining Pilipinas 2018 with Nicole Cordoves and Richard Gutierrez.

In 2019, Wurtzbach participated in the 2019 Southeast Asian Games opening ceremony.

On January 6, 2020, Wurtzbach had her own trending OPM song named after her, sung by BLYMNDT ft. Angelo and BRYC, which was a month after Catriona Gray's own trending song was released. The latter's song was actually sung by Matthaios.

Personal life
Although a practicing Roman Catholic, Wurtzbach openly supports views contrary to the teachings of the Catholic Church, particularly the distribution of birth control via full implementation of the Philippines' Reproductive Health Law and the recognition of LGBT rights in the Philippines. On December 13, 2016, she received a personal rosary from Pope Francis.

Wurtzbach is an advocate for gender equality. On Instagram she declared her support for the LGBT community in light of the Orlando nightclub shooting in 2016. In 2018, she called on the Philippine Senate to pass the SOGIE Equality Bill. In 2017, Wurtzbach was named a UNAIDS Goodwill Ambassador for Asia and the Pacific.

In 2017, Wurtzbach tweeted that she intended to remain unmarried and childfree. However, in June 2020, she confirmed her relationship with Scottish entrepreneur Jeremy Jauncey. Two years later, they announced their engagement.

Filmography

Television

Film

Awards and nominations

See also 
 Gloria Diaz
 Margie Moran
 Catriona Gray
 Binibining Pilipinas
 Philippines at Major Beauty Pageants

Notes

References

External links

 

 

1989 births
Living people
ABS-CBN personalities
Actresses from Misamis Oriental
Actresses from Stuttgart
Binibining Pilipinas winners
Filipino child actresses
Filipino female models
Filipino people of German descent
Filipino Roman Catholics
21st-century Roman Catholics
Filipino television actresses
HIV/AIDS activists
Filipino LGBT rights activists
Miss Universe 2015 contestants
Miss Universe winners
People from Cagayan de Oro
Visayan people